Joan of Navarre may refer to:
Joan I of Navarre (1273–1305), daughter of Henry I of Navarre
Joan II of Navarre (1312–1349), daughter of Louis I of Navarre
Joan of Navarre (nun) (1326–1387), daughter of Joan II of Navarre and Philip III of Navarre
Joan of Navarre, Queen of England (1370–1437), daughter of Charles II of Navarre and wife of Henry IV of England
Joan of Navarre (regent) (1382–1413), daughter of Charles III of Navarre
Joan III of Navarre (1528–1572), daughter of Henry II of Navarre